99.3 Wow FM (DXBS 99.3 MHz) is an FM station owned and operated by Iddes Broadcast Group. Its studios and transmitter are located at #3 Polina Village, Brgy. Mangagoy, Bislig.

References

External links
Wow FM FB Page

Radio stations in Surigao del Sur
Radio stations established in 2002